Grange Road may be:

 Grange Road, Cambridge, England
 Grange Road railway station, a former railway station in Tunbridge Wells, England
 Grange Road, Adelaide, Australia
 Grange Road, Singapore

See also 
 La Grange Road, Chicago, United States
 La Grange Road (Metra), Amtrak station, Chicago, USA